L25 may refer to:
 50S ribosomal protein L25
 L25 ribosomal protein leader
 , a submarine of the Royal Navy
 , a sloop of the Royal Navy
 , a destroyer of the Royal Navy 
 Klemm L.25, a German monoplane
 McDonnell L-25, an American experimental convertiplane